A museum is a building or institution dedicated to the acquisition, conservation, study, exhibition, and educational interpretation of objects having scientific, historical, cultural or artistic value.

Museum may also refer to:

Arts, entertainment, and media

Films
 Museum (2016 film) directed by Keishi Ōtomo and based on the manga by Ryosuke Tomoe
 Museum (2018 film), Mexican film

Music
 The Museum (band), an American contemporary Christian band
 Museum (Ball Park Music album), 2012
 Museum (Mike Tramp album), 2014
 The Museum (album), by Nana Mizuki, 2007
 "Museum" (song), a 1967 song by Donovan, covered by Herman's Hermit

Other uses in arts, entertainment, and media
 Museum (periodical), an imprint of Tokyo National Museum
 The Museum (TV series), a 2007 British documentary series

Places
 Museum railway station, a train station in Sydney, Australia
 Museum (TTC), a subway station in Toronto, Canada
 Museum Lane, London
 Museum Mile, New York City
 Museum Road, Oxford
 Museum Street, London
 Museum Planning Area, Singapore

Other uses
 .museum the internet top-level domain
 Society of Christian Doctrine or Magister Utinam Sequater Evangelium Universus Mundus (M.U.S.E.U.M.)

See also
 Muzeum (Prague Metro), a railway station in Prague, Czech Republic